Tarandus can refer to:

 tarandus, the specific name of the scientific name of reindeer
 Tarandus a legendary animal, mentioned in Greek, Roman and medieval scripts.
 Tarandus (constellation), also known as Rangifer (both names meaning the Reindeer in Latin), an obsolete constellation
 Dodia tarandus, a species of moth
  (Swederus, 1787), a species of beetle

See also
Reindeer (disambiguation)